Epinotia sordidana is a moth of the family Tortricidae found in Europe.

The wingspan is 18–23 mm. The moth flies from August to November. .

The larvae mainly feed on alder.

Notes
The flight season refers to Belgium and The Netherlands. This may vary in other parts of the range.

External links
 Lepidoptera of Belgium
 Epinotia sordidana at UKmoths

Olethreutinae
Moths described in 1824
Taxa named by Jacob Hübner
Tortricidae of Europe